Bryan Saunders (9 July 1952 – April 2022) was a Canadian sprinter. He competed in the 400 metres at the 1976 Summer Olympics and the 1984 Summer Olympics. Saunders won a bronze medal in the 400 metres at the 1975 Summer Universiade and in the 4 x 400 metres relay at the 1975 Pan American Games.

Saunders represented Canada in the 4 x 400 metres relay at the 1983 World Championships in Athletics.

References

External links
 Canadian Olympians
 
 

1952 births
2022 deaths
Athletes (track and field) at the 1976 Summer Olympics
Athletes (track and field) at the 1984 Summer Olympics
Canadian male sprinters
Olympic track and field athletes of Canada
Athletes (track and field) at the 1975 Pan American Games
Athletes (track and field) at the 1979 Pan American Games
Athletes (track and field) at the 1983 Pan American Games
Pan American Games bronze medalists for Canada
Pan American Games medalists in athletics (track and field)
Athletes (track and field) at the 1978 Commonwealth Games
Commonwealth Games competitors for Canada
Universiade medalists in athletics (track and field)
World Athletics Championships athletes for Canada
Trinidad and Tobago emigrants to Canada
Black Canadian track and field athletes
Sportspeople from Port of Spain
Universiade bronze medalists for Canada
Medalists at the 1975 Summer Universiade
Medalists at the 1975 Pan American Games